The New Zealand dollar (sign: $, NZ$; code: NZD) is the official currency and legal tender of New Zealand, the Cook Islands, Niue, the Ross Dependency, Tokelau, and a British territory, the Pitcairn Islands. Within New Zealand, it is almost always abbreviated with the dollar sign ($). "$NZ" or "NZ$" are sometimes used when necessary to distinguish it from other dollar-denominated currencies.

Introduced in 1967, the dollar is subdivided into 100 cents. Altogether it has five coins and five banknotes with the smallest being the 10-cent coin; smaller denominations have been discontinued due to inflation and production costs.

In the context of currency trading, the New Zealand dollar is sometimes informally called the "Kiwi" or "Kiwi dollar", since the flightless bird, the kiwi, is depicted on its one-dollar coin. It is the tenth most traded currency in the world, representing 2.1% of global foreign exchange market daily turnover in 2019.

History

Introduction

Prior to the introduction of the New Zealand dollar in 1967, the New Zealand pound was the currency of New Zealand, which had been distinct from the pound sterling since 1933. The pound used the £sd system, in which the pound was divided into 20 shillings and one shilling was divided into 12 pence, a system which by the 1950s was considered complicated and cumbersome.

Switching to decimal currency had been proposed in New Zealand since the 1930s, although only in the 1950s did any plans come to fruition. In 1957, a committee was set up by the Government to investigate decimal currency. The idea fell on fertile ground, and in 1963, the Government decided to decimalise New Zealand currency. The Decimal Currency Act was passed in 1964, setting the date of transition to 10 July 1967. Words such as "fern", "kiwi" and "zeal" were proposed to avoid confusion with the word "dollar", which many people associate with the United States dollar. In the end, the word "dollar" was chosen anyway, and an anthropomorphic dollar note cartoon character called "Mr. Dollar" became the symbol of transition in a huge publicity campaign.

On Monday 10 July 1967 ("Decimal Currency Day"), the New Zealand dollar was introduced to replace the pound at a rate of two dollars to one pound (one dollar to ten shillings, ten cents to one shilling,  cent to a penny). Some 27 million new banknotes were printed and 165 million new coins were minted for the changeover.

Exchange rate
The New Zealand dollar was initially pegged to both the British pound sterling and the United States dollar at NZ$1 = UK£ = US$1.40. On 21 November 1967 sterling was devalued from UK£1 = US$2.80 to US$2.40 (see Bretton Woods system), but the New Zealand dollar was devalued even more from NZ$1 = US$1.40 to US$1.12, to match the value of the Australian dollar.

In 1971 the US devalued its dollar relative to gold, leading New Zealand on 23 December to peg its dollar at US$1.216 with a 4.5% fluctuation range, keeping the same gold value. From 9 July 1973 to 4 March 1985 the dollar's value was determined from a trade-weighted basket of currencies.

On 4 March 1985, the NZ$ was floated at the initial rate of US$0.4444. Since then the dollar's value has been determined by the financial markets, and has been in the range of about US$0.39 to 0.88.

The dollar's post-float low was US$0.3922 on 22 November 2000, and it reached a post-float high on 9 July 2014 of US$0.8821. Much of this medium-term variation in the exchange rate has been attributed to differences in interest rates.

The New Zealand dollar is among the 10 most-traded currencies.

On 11 June 2007 the Reserve Bank sold an unknown worth of New Zealand dollars for nine billion USD in an attempt to drive down its value. This is the first intervention in the markets by the Bank since the float in 1985.

Two suspected interventions followed, but they were not as successful as the first: the first appeared to be initially effective, with the dollar dropping to approximately US$0.7490 from near US$0.7620. However, within little more than a month it had risen to new post-float highs, reaching US$0.8103 on 23 July 2007.

After reaching its post-float record high in early 2008, the value of the NZ$ plummeted throughout much of the 2nd half of 2008 and the first quarter of 2009 as a response to the global economic downturn and flight by investors away from "riskier" currencies such as the NZ$. The NZ$ bottomed out at approximately US$0.50 on 6 March 2009. However, it rebounded strongly as the year progressed, reaching the US$0.75 range by November 2009.

By late 2012, the dollar was holding above 80 US cents, occasionally reaching 85¢, prompting calls from the Green Party for quantitative easing. Unions also called on the Government and the Reserve Bank to take action, but as of February 2013 both had declined.

As of early June 2017, the NZD was trading at approximately US$0.71, and in early November 2019 it was valued as US$0.63 = NZ$1.

Coins

History
On the introduction of the dollar, coins came in denominations of 1c, 2c, 5c, 10c, 20c, and 50c. The 1c and 2c coins were bronze, the others were cupro-nickel. To ease transition, the 5c, 10c, and 20c were the same size as the sixpence, shilling and florin that they respectively replaced, and until 1970, the ten-cent coin bore the additional legend "One Shilling".  The obverse designs of all the coins featured Arnold Machin's portrait of Queen Elizabeth II, with the legend ELIZABETH II NEW ZEALAND [date]. The reverse sides of coins introduced in 1967 did not follow the designs that were originally intended for them. Those modern art and sculpture themed designs were leaked to a newspaper and met a very negative public reaction. The final releases were given more conservative designs in line with public expectations.

In 1986, New Zealand adopted Raphael Maklouf's new portrait of the Queen. The 1c and 2c coins were last minted for circulation in 1987, with collector coins being made for 1988. The coins were demonetised on 30 April 1990. The lack of 1c and 2c coins meant that cash transactions were normally rounded to the nearest 5c (10c from 2006), a process known as Swedish rounding.

On 11 February 1991, aluminium-bronze $1 and $2 coins were introduced to replace existing $1 and $2 notes. In 1999, Ian Rank-Broadley's portrait of the Queen was introduced and the legend rearranged to read "".

On 11 November 2004 the Reserve Bank announced that it proposed to take the 5c coin out of circulation and to make the 50c, 20c and 10c coins smaller and use plated steel to make them lighter. After a three-month public submission period that ended on 4 February 2005, the Reserve Bank announced on 31 March that it would go ahead with the proposed changes. The changeover period started on 31 July 2006, with the old coins usable until 31 October 2006. The old 50c, 20c, 10c and 5c pieces are now no longer legal tender, but are still redeemable at the Reserve Bank. Prior to the change over, these coins were similar, save for the legend and reverse artwork, to international (mainly Commonwealth) coins of the same British-derived sizes, which led to coins from other currencies, particularly older coins, being accepted by vending machines and many retailers.

On 23 March 2015, the Reserve Bank of New Zealand issued its first commemorative circulating coin to mark the centenary of the Gallipoli landings.  The coin was also New Zealand's first colour circulating coin. One million coins, with a denomination of 50c, were minted.

On 1 October 2018, the Reserve Bank of New Zealand issued its second commemorative circulating coin to mark the centenary of Armistice day.  The coin was also New Zealand's second colour circulating coin.  Two million coins, with a denomination of 50c, were minted.

Current circulating coins

Future 
After the death of Queen Elizabeth II in September 2022, the Reserve Bank said it would exhaust its existing coin stocks before introducing new coins featuring King Charles III. Based on current stock levels, this would likely be several years away.

Banknotes

History
In 1967, notes were introduced in denominations of $1, $2, $5, $10, $20 and $100, with all except the $5 replacing their pound predecessors. The original series of dollar notes featured on the obverse a portrait of Queen Elizabeth II wearing Queen Alexandra's Kokoshnik tiara, King George's VI festoon necklace, and Queen Mary's floret earrings, while the reverse featured native birds and plants. The notes were changed slightly in 1981 due to a change of printer (from De La Rue to Bradbury, Wilkinson & Co.)—the most noticeable difference being the portrait based upon a photograph by Peter Grugeon, in which Queen Elizabeth II is wearing Grand Duchess Vladimir's tiara and Queen Victoria's golden jubilee necklace. The $50 note was added in 1983 to fill the long gap between the $20 and the $100 notes. $1 and $2 notes were discontinued in 1991 after being replaced with coins.

A new series of notes, known as Series 5 was introduced in 1992. The obverse of each note featured a notable New Zealander, while the reverse featured a native New Zealand bird and New Zealand scenery. The Queen remained on the $20 note. In 1999, series 6 polymer notes replaced the paper notes. The designs remained much the same, but were changed slightly to accommodate new security features, with the most obvious changes being the two transparent windows.

In 2015–16, new Series 7 notes were issued, refreshing the note design and improving security features. As of 2021, Series 6 and 7 notes are currently legal tender.

In September 2022, following the death of Queen Elizabeth II, the Reserve Bank said it would exhaust its existing stocks of $20 notes before introducing new notes featuring King Charles III.

Current circulating banknotes

In foreign exchange markets

History
With the breakdown of the Bretton Woods system in 1971, both Australia and New Zealand converted the mostly-fixed foreign exchange regimes to a moving peg against the US dollar. In September 1974, Australia moved to a peg against a basket of currencies called the trade weighted index (TWI) in an effort to reduce fluctuations associated with its peg to the US dollar. The peg to the TWI was changed to a moving peg in November 1976, causing the actual value of the peg to be periodically adjusted.

Since the late 1990s, and certainly since the end of the Cold War the US dollar has had less and less overall influence over the value of both the NZ$ and A$ against other currencies.

Current exchange rates

In currency trading
The New Zealand dollar contributes greatly to the total global exchange market—far in excess of New Zealand's relative share of population or global GDP.

According to the Bank for International Settlements, the New Zealand dollar's share of global foreign exchange market daily turnover in 2016 was 2.1% (up from 1.6% in 2010) giving it a rank of 11th. Trading in the currency has climbed steadily since the same survey in 1998 when the NZD's ranking was 17th and the share of turnover was just 0.2%.

See also
 Australian dollar
 Cook Islands dollar
 Economy of New Zealand
 History of Chatham Islands numismatics
 Kauri bond
 Pitcairn Islands dollar
 Postal orders of New Zealand

Notes

References

External links

 ANZ New Zealand – View the current exchange rate graphs of NZ$/inr

 Reserve bank of New Zealand – Money issuing Authority
 Historical New Zealand Trading bank notes – Old extremely rare banknotes of New Zealand

 Images of historic and modern New Zealand bank notes
 Current and historical banknotes of New Zealand 

Currencies of the Commonwealth of Nations
Currencies of New Zealand
Currencies of British Overseas Territories
Dollar
Currencies introduced in 1967
Dollar
Currencies of the Cook Islands